Brain ischemia is a condition in which there is insufficient bloodflow to the brain to meet metabolic demand.  This leads to poor oxygen supply or cerebral hypoxia and thus leads to the death of brain tissue or cerebral infarction/ischemic stroke.  It is a sub-type of stroke along with subarachnoid hemorrhage and  intracerebral hemorrhage.

Ischemia leads to alterations in brain metabolism, reduction in metabolic rates, and energy crisis.

There are two types of ischemia: focal ischemia, which is confined to a specific region of the brain; and global ischemia, which encompasses wide areas of brain tissue.

The main symptoms of brain ischemia involve impairments in vision, body movement, and speaking. The causes of brain ischemia vary from sickle cell anemia to congenital heart defects. Symptoms of brain ischemia can include unconsciousness, blindness, problems with coordination, and weakness in the body. Other effects that may result from brain ischemia are stroke, cardiorespiratory arrest, and irreversible brain damage.

An interruption of blood flow to the brain for more than 10 seconds causes unconsciousness, and an interruption in flow for more than a few minutes generally results in irreversible brain damage.  In 1974, Hossmann and Zimmermann demonstrated that ischemia induced in mammalian brains for up to an hour can be at least partially recovered. Accordingly, this discovery raised the possibility of intervening after brain ischemia before the damage becomes irreversible.

Symptoms and signs
The symptoms of brain ischemia reflect the anatomical region undergoing blood and oxygen deprivation. Ischemia within the arteries branching from the internal carotid artery may result in symptoms such as blindness in one eye, weakness in one arm or leg, or weakness in one entire side of the body. Ischemia within the arteries branching from the vertebral arteries in the back of the brain may result in symptoms such as dizziness, vertigo, double vision, or weakness on both sides of the body . Other symptoms include difficulty speaking, slurred speech, and the loss of coordination.  The symptoms of brain ischemia range from mild to severe.  Further, symptoms can last from a few seconds to a few minutes or extended periods of time.  If the brain becomes damaged irreversibly and infarction occurs, the symptoms may be permanent.

Similar to cerebral hypoxia, severe or prolonged brain ischemia will result in unconsciousness, brain damage or death,  mediated by the ischemic cascade.

Multiple cerebral ischemic events may lead to subcortical ischemic depression, also known as vascular depression. This condition is most commonly seen in elderly depressed patients. Late onset depression is increasingly seen as a distinct sub-type of depression, and can be detected with an MRI.

Causes
Brain ischemia has been linked to a variety of diseases or abnormalities.  Individuals with sickle cell anemia, compressed blood vessels, ventricular tachycardia, plaque buildup in the arteries, blood clots, extremely low blood pressure as a result of heart attack, and congenital heart defects have a higher predisposition to brain ischemia in comparison to the average population. Sickle cell anemia may cause brain ischemia associated with the irregularly shaped blood cells. Sickle shaped blood cells clot more easily than normal blood cells, impeding blood flow to the brain.

Compression of blood vessels may also lead to brain ischemia, by blocking the arteries that carry oxygen to the brain. Tumors are one cause of blood vessel compression.

Ventricular tachycardia represents a series of irregular heartbeats that may cause the heart to completely shut down resulting in cessation of oxygen flow. Further, irregular heartbeats may result in formation of blood clots, thus leading to oxygen deprivation to all organs.

Blockage of arteries due to plaque buildup may also result in ischemia.  Even a small amount of plaque build up can result in the narrowing of passageways, causing that area to become more prone to blood clots. Large blood clots can also cause ischemia by blocking blood flow.

A heart attack can also cause brain ischemia due to the correlation that exists between heart attack and low blood pressure. Extremely low blood pressure usually represents the inadequate oxygenation of tissues. Untreated heart attacks may slow blood flow enough that blood may start to clot and prevent the flow of blood to the brain or other major organs. Extremely low blood pressure can also result from drug overdose and reactions to drugs. Therefore, brain ischemia can result from events other than heart attacks.

Congenital heart defects may also cause brain ischemia due to the lack of appropriate artery formation and connection. People with congenital heart defects may also be prone to blood clots.

Other  events that may result in brain ischemia include cardiorespiratory arrest, stroke, and severe irreversible brain damage.

Recently, Moyamoya disease has also been identified as a potential cause for brain ischemia.  Moyamoya disease is an extremely rare cerebrovascular condition that limits blood circulation to the brain, consequently leading to oxygen deprivation.

Pathophysiology
During brain ischemia, the brain cannot perform aerobic metabolism due to the loss of oxygen and substrate. The brain is not able to switch to anaerobic metabolism and, because it does not have any long term energy stored, the levels of adenosine triphosphate (ATP) drop rapidly, approaching zero within 4 minutes. In the absence of biochemical energy, cells begin to lose the ability to maintain electrochemical gradients. Consequently, there is a massive influx of calcium into the cytosol, a massive release of glutamate from synaptic vesicles, lipolysis, calpain activation, and the arrest of protein synthesis. Additionally, removal of metabolic wastes is slowed.  The interruption of blood flow to the brain for ten seconds results in the immediate loss of consciousness.  The interruption of blood flow for twenty seconds results in the stopping of electrical activity. An area called a penumbra may result, wherein neurons do not receive enough blood to communicate, however do receive sufficient oxygenation to avoid cell death for a short period of time.

Diagnosis

Classification
The broad term, "stroke" can be divided into three categories: brain ischemia, subarachnoid hemorrhage and  intracerebral hemorrhage.  Brain ischemia can be further subdivided, by cause, into thrombotic, embolic, and hypoperfusion.  Thrombotic and embolic are generally focal or multifocal in nature while hypoperfusion affects the brain globally.

Focal brain ischemia
Focal brain ischemia occurs when a blood clot has occluded a cerebral vessel.  Focal brain ischemia reduces blood flow to a specific brain region, increasing the risk of cell death to that particular area.  It can be either caused by thrombosis or embolism.

Global brain ischemia
Global brain ischemia occurs when blood flow to the brain is halted or drastically reduced. This is commonly caused by cardiac arrest. If sufficient circulation is restored within a short period of time, symptoms may be transient. However, if a significant amount of time passes before restoration, brain damage may be permanent.  While reperfusion may be essential to protecting as much brain tissue as possible, it may also lead to reperfusion injury. Reperfusion injury is classified as the damage that ensues after restoration of blood supply to ischemic tissue.

Due to different susceptibility to ischemia of various brain regions, a global brain ischemia may cause focal brain infarction. The cerebral cortex and striatum are more susceptible than the thalamus, and the thalamus in turn is more sensitive than the brainstem. Partial cerebral cortex infarction from global brain ischemia typically manifests as watershed stroke.

Biomarker
Use of biomarker is one method that has been evaluated to predict the risk of stroke, diagnose stroke and its causes, predict stroke severity and outcome, and guide prevention therapy.

Blood Biomarkers: Many proteins and RNA biomarkers identified are connected to ischemic stroke pathophysiology includes

Central Nervous System Tissue Injury Biomarkers- S100B, Glial fibrillary acidic protein, enolase 2,Anti-NMDA receptor encephalitis.

Inflammatory Biomarkers - c-reactive protein, Interleukin 6, Tumor necrosis factor α,VCAM-1.

Coagulation / Thrombosis Biomarkers - Fibrinogen, D-dimer, Von Willebrand factor

Other Biomarkers- PARK7, B-type neurotrophic growth factor.

Treatment
Alteplase (t-PA) is an effective medication for acute ischemic stroke.  When given within 3 hours, treatment with tpa significantly improves the probability of a favourable outcome versus treatment with placebo.

The outcome of brain ischemia is influenced by the quality of subsequent supportive care.  Systemic blood pressure (or slightly above) should be maintained so that cerebral blood flow is restored.  Also, hypoxaemia and hypercapnia should be avoided.  Seizures can induce more damage; accordingly, anticonvulsants should be prescribed and should a seizure occur, aggressive treatment should be undertaken.  Hyperglycaemia should also be avoided during brain ischemia.

Management
When someone presents with an ischemic event, treatment of the underlying cause is critical for prevention of further episodes.

Anticoagulation with warfarin or heparin may be used if the patient has atrial fibrillation.

Operative procedures such as carotid endarterectomy and carotid stenting may be performed if the patient has a significant amount of plaque in the carotid arteries associated with the local ischemic events.

Research

Therapeutic hypothermia has been attempted to improve results post brain ischemia .  This procedure was suggested to be beneficial based on its effects post cardiac arrest.  Evidence supporting the use of therapeutic hypothermia after brain ischemia, however, is limited.

A closely related disease to brain ischemia is brain hypoxia.  Brain hypoxia is the condition in which there is a decrease in the oxygen supply to the brain even in the presence of adequate blood flow.  If hypoxia lasts for long periods of time, coma, seizures, and even brain death may occur.  Symptoms of brain hypoxia are similar to ischemia and include inattentiveness, poor judgment, memory loss, and a decrease in motor coordination.  Potential causes of brain hypoxia are suffocation, carbon monoxide poisoning, severe anemia, and use of drugs such as cocaine and other amphetamines.  Other causes associated with brain hypoxia include drowning, strangling, choking, cardiac arrest, head trauma, and complications during general anesthesia.  Treatment strategies for brain hypoxia vary depending on the original cause of injury, primary and/or secondary.

See also
 Mechanism of anoxic depolarization in the brain
 Watershed stroke

References

Bibliography

Further reading
 Chang, Steven; Doty, James; Skirboll, Stephen; Steinberg, Gary. Cerebral ischemia . cgi.stanford.edu. URL last accessed February 26, 2006.

External links 

Vascular diseases
Stroke
Ischemia